2010–11 Raiffeisen Superliga was the twentieth season of top-tier football in Kosovo.

Stadiums and locations

League table

Results

Matches 1–22

Matches 23–33

External links
 Kosovo Superliga at RSSSF.org

Football Superleague of Kosovo seasons
Kosovo
1